Also or ALSO may refer to:

Advanced Life Support in Obstetrics (ALSO), a program developed by the American Academy of Family Physicians (AAFP)
Alsó-Fehér County, a historic administrative county (comitatus) of the Kingdom of Hungary
ALSO Group, one of the largest Swiss companies by revenue

See also 

 Alsos (disambiguation)
 See also (disambiguation)